Karthago Airlines was a privately owned airline based in Tunis, Tunisia, operating scheduled charter flights to Europe. Its main base was in Djerba-Zarzis Airport, but most of the flights were out of Tunis-Carthage International Airport.

History
The airline was established in 2001 and was owned by the Karthago Group (58 percent) and banks, insurers and tour trade investors (42 percent). The company had a stake in Egyptian airline KoralBlue Airlines, which was based at Sharm el-Sheikh International Airport.

Destinations
For the winter season 2010/11, Karthago Airlines was contracted to serve the following destinations on a regular, scheduled basis:
Denmark
Copenhagen - Copenhagen Airport
Sweden
Stockholm - Stockholm-Arlanda Airport
Tunisia
Tunis - Tunis-Carthage International Airport base

Fleet
As of January 2011, the Karthago Airlines fleet consisted of only one aircraft, a 21-year-old Boeing 737-300, which was equipped with 148 passenger seats in an all-economy class cabin layout.

References

Defunct airlines of Tunisia
Airlines established in 2001
Airlines disestablished in 2010
2001 establishments in Tunisia
Organisations based in Tunis
Defunct companies of Tunisia
Economy of Tunis
2010 disestablishments in Africa